Sixmilecross railway station served Sixmilecross in  County Tyrone in Northern Ireland.

The Portadown, Dungannon and Omagh Junction Railway opened the station on 1 January 1863. In 1876 it was taken over by the Great Northern Railway.

It closed on 15 February 1965.

Routes

References

Disused railway stations in County Tyrone
Railway stations opened in 1863
Railway stations closed in 1965
1863 establishments in Ireland
1965 disestablishments in Northern Ireland
Railway stations in Northern Ireland opened in the 19th century